The Claxton Shield is an annual competition held by the Australian Baseball Federation. The 2003 Shield reverted to its original form for the first time since 1988, due to the folding of the International Baseball League of Australia. The Shield was held in New South Wales at the Blacktown Olympic Park Baseball Stadium between 26 January to 1 February .

Ladder - After Round Robin

Championship series

Game 16: 31 January 2003 - Cut Throat Final 1st v 4th

Game 17: 31 January 2003 - Cut Throat Final 2nd v 3rd

Game 18: 1 February 2003 - Championship Game - Winner 1 vs 4 Vs Winner 2 vs 3
::*Box Score

Awards

Top Stats

All-Star Team

External links
Official Baseball Australia Website
Official 2003 Claxton Shield Website

Claxton Shield
Claxton Shield
January 2003 sports events in Australia
February 2003 sports events in Australia